Kenkia glandulosa, the pink planarian, is a flatworm in the family Kenkiidae. It is found only in the Devil's Icebox cave in Rock Bridge Memorial State Park in Boone County, Missouri, USA. The rarity of this species was once used as an argument to prevent the construction of a shopping mall in the area.

The species is an eyeless and de-pigmented flatworm that lives on the undersides of rocks. It is currently a species of conservation concern in the state of Missouri.

References

 Wicks, Carol, et al. “Disturbances in the Habitat Of Macrocotyla Glandulosa (Kenk).” Ecohydrology, 2010, doi:10.1002/eco.102.

Turbellaria
Natural history of Missouri
Boone County, Missouri
Animals described in 1956